Kahurangi Waititi (born 22 September 1982) is a New Zealand netball player in the ANZ Championship. She signed with the Central Pulse for the 2008 season, but has been signed to play for the Canterbury Tactix in 2009.

References
Central Pulse team profiles

1982 births
Living people
New Zealand netball players
Mainland Tactix players
Central Pulse players
ANZ Championship players
Waikato Bay of Plenty Magic players
Kahurangi